Tønsberg Region is a statistical metropolitan region in the county of Vestfold in southeastern Norway. It is centered on the city of Tønsberg.

1/ km²2/ Population per km²
As of October 2012

See also
Metropolitan Regions of Norway

Metropolitan regions of Norway
Tønsberg